Peace, Love, and Country Music is the second solo studio album by country music artist Ronnie Dunn. The album was released on April 8, 2014 via Dunn's own record label Little Will-E Records. Peace, Love, and Country Music is Dunn's first solo release since 2011's Ronnie Dunn released on Arista Nashville.

The lead off single for the album was "Kiss You There". It was released to radio on June 4, 2013 though a joint effort between Ronnie Dunn's Little Will-E Records and HitShop Records. The single charted #60 on the Billboards Country Airplay Charts. Following an unsuccessful radio run, LWR and HitShop parted ways. The second single from the album, "I Wish I Still Smoked Cigarettes", was released on iTunes on November 19, 2013. After the single's release, Dunn sat out on a small radio tour to promote the single.

Background 

Following two top 20 singles from Dunn's debut solo album, Ronnie Dunn, the third single, "Let the Cowboy Rock" was released in January 2012. The single stalled at #31 on the Country charts and Ronnie Dunn asked his fans through Facebook what they thought the fourth single should be. After this post, Ronnie was called by Sony when they informed him that his Facebook post "killed" the ""Let The Cowboy Rock" single. Ronnie then suggested that the fourth single from the album be "Once". The single was never released. On June 7, 2012, one year after the release of the album, Ronnie announced on Facebook that he and Sony had parted ways.

On June 4, 2013 Ronnie Dunn released a promo single "Country This" and the lead off single "Kiss You There" to SiriusXM radio. On June 6, 2013, Ronnie Dunn performed the two songs along with "Cowgirls Rock 'N Roll" and the title track from the album "Peace, Love, And Country Music" at the 2013 CMA Music Fest following the 2013 CMT Music Awards.

On June 9, 2013, Ronnie Dunn announced his new record deal with indie label HitShop Records. The deal was to be a joint effort between HitShop and Ronnie's own Little Will-E Records with HitShop assisting in radio distribution. However, after an unsuccessful run with "Kiss You There", LWR and HitShop parted ways.

On November 19, 2013 the second single "I Wish I Still Smoked Cigarettes" was released. To promote the single, Ronnie embarked on a small radio tour. He also performed on TV talk show such as Dr. Phil, The Doctors, and The Talk.

On January 22, 2014, another promo single "Grown Damn Man" was released through iTunes. Following the release of "Grown Damn Man" Ronnie Dunn and Jeff Balding announced that the new album Peace, Love, and Country Music would be released on April 8, 2014 in digital through iTunes and Amazon with a physical CD being released in partnership with country western store Country Outfitter.

Track listing

References

External links 

http://www.lovin-lyrics.com/2014/01/single-review-grown-damn-man-ronnie-dunn.html
http://tasteofcountry.com/ronnie-dunn-peace-love-and-country-music-album/
http://www.countryweekly.com/news/ronnie-dunn-releases-peace-love-and-country-music
http://www.countryoutfitter.com/style/ronnie-dunn-peace-love-and-country-music/
http://www.musicrow.com/2013/07/ronnie-dunn-forms-label-releases-single/

2014 albums
Ronnie Dunn albums